At the outbreak of the American Civil War in April 1861, Kansas was the newest U.S. state, admitted just months earlier in January. The state had formally rejected slavery by popular vote and vowed to fight on the side of the Union, though ideological divisions with neighboring Missouri, a slave state, had led to violent conflict in previous years and persisted for the duration of the war.

While Kansas was a rural frontier state distant from the major theaters of war and its Unionist government was never seriously threatened by Confederate military forces, several engagements did occur within its borders, as well as countless raids and skirmishes between local irregulars, including the Lawrence Massacre by pro-Confederate guerrillas under William Quantrill in August 1863. Later the state witnessed the defeat of Confederate General Sterling Price by Union General Alfred Pleasonton at the Battle of Mine Creek, the second-largest cavalry action of the war.

The decision of how Kansas would enter the Union was a pivotal one that forced the entire country to confront the political and social turmoil generated by the question of abolition and contributed to the strong division in sentiment that eventually erupted into war. The early violence there presaged the coming national conflict, and throughout the war, Kansas remained a staunchly loyal Union stronghold at the western edge of a border region otherwise populated by uneven governments and mixed sympathies.

Background
After the Territory of Kansas approved the anti-slavery Wyandotte Constitution, it was admitted to the Union on January 29, 1861, in the midst of the national secession crisis: six states had already seceded, and five more would follow in the coming months. The Kansas–Nebraska Act of 1854 had rescinded the former Missouri Compromise and permitted the territories of Kansas and Nebraska to determine whether they would enter the Union as slave or free states by popular sovereignty. Violence between pro-slavery and anti-slavery groups began almost immediately. The conflict was especially bloody along the Kansas–Missouri border, where Missouri Border Ruffians and Kansas Free-Staters formed bands of partisan rangers to raid and pillage opposition strongholds, earning it the name "Bleeding Kansas". Kansas' popular vote eventually chose against slavery, so Kansas would fight with the North.

As the local military organizations had fallen into disuse, the state's government had no well-organized militia, no arms, accouterments or supplies, nothing with which to meet Union Army demands except the united will of officials and citizens.

Military units

The first Kansas regiment was called on June 3, 1861, and the seventeenth, the last raised during the Civil War, on July 28, 1864. The entire quota assigned to Kansas was 16,654, and the number raised was 20,097, leaving a surplus of 3,443 to the credit of Kansas. About 1,000 Kansans joined Confederate forces since a number of people from the nation's south had settled in Kansas. There are no statistics on those serving the Confederacy, since some joined guerrilla units. This led to a 19th-century nickname for Kansas: the "Spartan State".

Lawrence Massacre

The first action in Kansas was not between the rival Union and Confederate armies; it was an 1863 guerrilla raid by pro-slavery "bushwhackers", led by William C. Quantrill, who descended on Lawrence, a center of anti-slavery Unionist sentiment, and proceeded to sack the town, burning numerous buildings and executing about 180 men and boys. As the raiders could be heard shouting "Remember Osceola!", the attack was taken to be a reprisal for an earlier raid by anti-slavery "Jayhawkers" on Osceola, Missouri. Some believed that it was also a response to the recent deaths of some of the raiders' imprisoned womenfolk, when their jailhouse collapsed, perhaps by design, though recent research shows that the collapse was almost certainly accidental. The massacre outraged the Confederate government, which had granted recognition to Quantrill under the Partisan Ranger Act, but now withdrew support from irregular forces.

Later engagements
The Battle of Baxter Springs, sometimes called the Baxter Springs Massacre, was a minor battle fought on October 6, 1863, near where the city of Baxter Springs now sits.

On October 25, 1864, a series of three battles occurred, the first two in Linn County, Kansas, with the final in Vernon County, Missouri. The first was the Battle of Marais des Cygnes (also called the "Battle of Trading Post"), the second, a cavalry battle, was the Battle of Mine Creek, a significant battle between mounted cavalry for Confederate forces and several brigades of Union cavalry that were pursuing General Price.  They were between Major General Sterling Price, leading the Missouri expedition, against Union forces under Major General Alfred Pleasonton. Price, after going south from Kansas City, was initially met by Pleasonton at Marais des Cygnes. At the end of the day, the Confederate army as an effective fighting force was decimated and forced to withdraw into Arkansas.

References

External links
 Access documents, photographs, and other primary sources on Kansas Memory, the Kansas State Historical Society's digital portal
 Online Exhibit - Keep the Flag to the Front, Kansas Historical Society
 Cool Things - Civil War Battle Flags, Kansas Historical Society
 The Civil War in Kansas: A Bibliography, Kansas Historical Society

 
 History of Kansas
 American Civil War by state